Alopoglossus plicatus, Taylor's largescale lizard, is a species of lizard in the family Alopoglossidae. It is found in Costa Rica, Panama, and Colombia.

References

Alopoglossus
Reptiles described in 1949
Taxa named by Edward Harrison Taylor
Taxobox binomials not recognized by IUCN